Charles Aznavour Square may refer to:

Charles Aznavour Square, Gyumri, Armenia
Charles Aznavour Square, Yerevan, Armenia